The Archdiocese of Washington is a Latin Church ecclesiastical territory or archdiocese of the Catholic Church in the United States. Its territorial remit encompasses the District of Columbia and the counties of Calvert, Charles, Montgomery, Prince George's and Saint Mary's in the state of Maryland. It was originally part of the Archdiocese of Baltimore.

The archdiocese crosses a state line. Three other U.S. Latin Church dioceses (Wilmington, Norwich and Gallup) also do this, but they each have territory in more than one state.

The Archdiocese of Washington is home to The Catholic University of America, the only national university operated by the United States Conference of Catholic Bishops (USCCB) and Georgetown University, the oldest Catholic and Jesuit institution of higher education in the country.

In addition, the Basilica of the National Shrine of the Immaculate Conception, a minor basilica dedicated to the nation's patroness, the Immaculate Conception, is located within it, and it is not the archdiocesan cathedral (nor even a parish of the archdiocese). The cathedral of the archdiocese is the Cathedral of St. Matthew the Apostle in downtown Washington.

Prelature

The ordinary of the Archdiocese of Washington is an archbishop whose cathedra is in the Cathedral of St. Matthew the Apostle in the City of Washington and who is metropolitan of the Ecclesiastical Province of Washington. Its sole suffragan see is the Diocese of Saint Thomas in the United States Virgin Islands.

The first Archbishop of Washington was Michael Joseph Curley, appointed in 1939. Eight years later, on November 15, 1947, the archdiocese received its first residential archbishop, with the appointment of Patrick Aloysius O'Boyle.  Donald Wuerl served as the most recent ordinary of the archdiocese. Wuerl resigned as Archbishop of Washington on October 12, 2018, in the wake of revelations about his poor handling of incidents of sex abuse when he served as Bishop of Pittsburgh. However, Wuerl still led the archdiocese as apostolic administrator until a successor was installed.

On April 4, 2019, Wilton Daniel Gregory was appointed archbishop by Pope Francis. The same day, the Archdiocese of Washington announced that Gregory would be installed as the seventh Archbishop of Washington. Gregory, who was originally scheduled to be installed on May 17, 2019, was installed on May 21, 2019, becoming the first African American to lead the Archdiocese of Washington. Pope Francis raised Wilton Daniel Gregory to the rank of cardinal at a consistory held in Rome on November 28, 2020. He is the first American with African ancestry to become a Roman Catholic cardinal.

History
On March 25, 1634, the first Catholic Mass in the English-speaking colonies was celebrated by Andrew White on St. Clement's Island, Maryland, in what is now part of the Archdiocese of Washington. The Catholic founders of the Maryland settlement then established the colony as a place of religious freedom. During the colonial era, however, when others took power, Catholics would become a persecuted people suffering the wrath of oppression allowed by local penal laws.

Upon the founding of the United States, a Jesuit priest, John Carroll, was elected head of the missionary territory (later Prefecture Apostolic) of the United States. In 1789 the Diocese of Baltimore (later the Archdiocese of Baltimore) was established with Carroll as its first bishop, and given ecclesiastical jurisdiction over the entire nation.

On July 22, 1939, Pope Pius XII created the Archdiocese of Washington from territory which was then within the Archdiocese of Baltimore, with a single prelate serving as the archbishop of both archdioceses, two ecclesiastical jurisdictions united in persona episcopi. The Archdiocese dates its founding from 1939. On November 15, 1947, Pope Pius appointed Washington's first residential archbishop. The Archdiocese of Washington became a metropolitan see on October 12, 1965, when the Diocese of Saint Thomas became its only suffragan see.

Sex abuse scandal
On September 26, 2018, it was announced that the Archdiocese of Washington was now one of four American Catholic dioceses under investigation by the United States Conference of Catholic Bishops for reports of sex abuse. Accused former cardinal and Washington archbishop Theodore McCarrick had served in each diocese. On October 15, 2018, the Archdiocese of Washington released the names of 31 clergy who served in the archdiocese and were credibly accused of sexually abusing minors since 1948. On August 15, 2019, archdiocesan priest Urbano Vazquez was convicted of four counts of sexual abuse involving two girls. On November 22, 2019, Vazquez was sentenced to 15 years in prison.

In October 2019, the Washington Post reported that police were investigating an allegation that the former Bishop of Wheeling-Charleston, Michael Joseph Bransfield, had molested a 9-year-old girl during a September 2012 pilgrimage to the Basilica of the National Shrine of the Immaculate Conception in Washington, D.C., while on a trip led by Bransfield. Prior to being appointed bishop of the Diocese of Wheeling-Charleston in 2004, Bransfield long served at the Basilica, being named assistant director and director of liturgy (1980), director of finance (1982), and director (1986) at the National Shrine of the Immaculate Conception. The Archdiocese of Washington was subpoenaed for documents in connection with the investigation. Bransfield denied the allegation. In December 2019, the Washington Post revealed that Bransfield had paid $350,000 to Holy See and church officials during a sex abuse probe against him. The "hush money" payments involved acts of sex abuse he reportedly committed when he was at the Basilica in the 1980s. The same report also revealed that during his time as Archbishop of Washington, McCarrick used his "Archbishop's Special Fund" to make similar hush money payments in order to cover acts of sex abuse he had committed in other Catholic dioceses. The archdiocese took in nearly a third less money in its 2019 annual fundraising appeal, which had been renamed from "Cardinal's Appeal" to "Annual Appeal", in the wake of the scandals.

Bishops
The list of bishops and their terms of service:

Archbishops of Washington
 Michael Joseph Curley (1939–1947), concurrently the Archbishop of Baltimore
 Patrick Aloysius O'Boyle (1947–1973)
 William Wakefield Baum (1973–1980), appointed Prefect of the Congregation for Catholic Education and later Major Penitentiary of the Apostolic Penitentiary
 James Aloysius Hickey (1980–2000)
 Theodore Edgar McCarrick (2001–2006; former cardinal, laicized for sexual abuse)
 Donald William Wuerl (2006–2018)
 Wilton Daniel Gregory (2019–present)

Auxiliary bishops
 John Michael McNamara (1947–1960)
 Patrick Joseph McCormick (1950–1953)
 Philip Matthew Hannan (1956–1965), appointed Archbishop of New Orleans
 William Joseph McDonald (1964–1967), appointed Auxiliary Bishop of San Francisco
 John Selby Spence (1964–1973)
 Edward John Herrmann (1966–1973), appointed Bishop of Columbus
 Thomas William Lyons (1974–1988)
 Eugene Antonio Marino (1974–1988), appointed Archbishop of Atlanta
 Thomas Cajetan Kelly (1977–1981), appointed Archbishop of Louisville
 Alvaro Corrada del Rio (1985–1997), appointed Apostolic Administrator of Caguas and later Bishop of Tyler and Bishop of Mayaguez
 William George Curlin (1988–1994), appointed Bishop of Charlotte
 Leonard Olivier (1988–2004)
 William E. Lori (1995–2001), appointed Bishop of Bridgeport and later Archbishop of Baltimore
 Kevin Joseph Farrell (2001–2007), appointed Bishop of Dallas and later Prefect of the Dicastery for the Laity, Family and Life (elevated to cardinal in 2016)
 Francisco González Valer, S.F. (2001–2014)
 Martin Holley (2004–2016), appointed Bishop of Memphis
 Barry Christopher Knestout (2008–2018), appointed Bishop of Richmond
 Mario E. Dorsonville (2015–present)
 Roy Edward Campbell (2017–present)
 Michael William Fisher (2018–2020), appointed Bishop of Buffalo
 Juan Esposito-Garcia (2023-present)
 Evelio Menjivar-Ayala (2023-present)

Other priests of the diocese who became bishops
 John Francis Donoghue, appointed Bishop of Charlotte in 1984 and later Archbishop of Atlanta
 David Edward Foley, appointed Auxiliary Bishop of Richmond in 1986 and later Bishop of Birmingham
 Raymond James Boland, appointed Bishop of Birmingham in 1988 and later Bishop of Kansas City-Saint Joseph
 Mark Edward Brennan, appointed Auxiliary Bishop of Baltimore in 2016 and later Bishop of Wheeling-Charleston
 William D. Byrne, appointed Bishop of Springfield in Massachusetts in 2020

Parishes

Schools

The archdiocese centralized school administration as part of its Center City Consortium, which was established in 1997.

 High schools

Colleges

Colleges and universities
 The Catholic University of America
 Georgetown University
 Trinity Washington University

Seminaries
Redemptoris Mater Seminary
 St. John Paul II Seminary
 Theological College
 Dominican House of Studies

Archdiocesan cemeteries
In addition to the nearly four dozen of its parishes which have their own cemeteries, the archdiocese owns and operates five major cemeteries:
 Mount Olivet Cemetery, Washington, D.C.
 Gate of Heaven Cemetery, Silver Spring, Maryland
 St. Mary's Queen of Peace Cemetery, Helen, Maryland
 Resurrection Cemetery, Clinton, Maryland
 All Souls Cemetery, Germantown, Maryland

Two former parish cemeteries are also operated by the archdiocese:
 St. John's Cemetery, Forest Glen, Maryland
 St. Mary's Cemetery, Washington, D.C.

Province of Washington, D.C.

 Diocese of Saint Thomas

See also

 Catholic Church in the United States
 Ecclesiastical Province of Washington
 Global organisation of the Catholic Church
 List of Roman Catholic archdioceses (by country and continent)
 List of Roman Catholic dioceses (alphabetical) (including archdioceses)
 List of Roman Catholic dioceses (structured view) (including archdioceses)
 List of the Catholic cathedrals of the United States
 List of the Catholic dioceses of the United States
 Franciscan Monastery of the Holy Land in America
 St. Mary's City, Maryland

References

External links
 Roman Catholic Archdiocese of Washington Official Site
 Cathedral of Saint Matthew the Apostle
 Alphabetical Listing of Parishes 

 
Washington
Religious organizations based in Washington, D.C.
Catholic Church in Washington, D.C.
Catholic Church in Maryland
Christian organizations established in 1947
Washington
1947 establishments in Washington, D.C.